Moinești was a Dacian fortified town.

References

Dacian fortresses in Bacău County
Historic monuments in Bacău County
History of Western Moldavia